Margit Marjatta Margareetta Eskman (29 April 1925 – 15 September 1990) was a Finnish politician. She was a member of the Parliament of Finland from 1966 to 1975, representing Turku Province North as a member of the Social Democratic Party. She was the Second Minister of Finance from February to May 1972, the first woman to hold that position. Eskman later served as the director-general of Finland's national social security agency and the National Board of Social Welfare.

Early life and education
Eskman was born on 29 April 1925 in Hattula, Finland, and had to work in a shoe factory instead of attending secondary school. In 1966, Eskman received a degree in taxation from the School of Social Sciences.

Political career
Eskman's parents had been active within the Social Democratic Party (SDP) since she was young. After she completed her studies in municipal government in 1947, she worked in various roles in the municipal governments of Hämeenkyrö, Mellilä, and Helsinki. In 1952, Eskman began working as the municipal secretary in Kalvola, a role she held until 1963 when she became the municipal secretary in Aitolahti. In 1953, she became involved with the women's branch of the SDP. She married Martti Eskman, who was a social services director, in 1956. From 1964 to 1972, she was the social secretary of the city of Pori.

Eskman was elected to the Parliament of Finland in 1966 to represent the constituency of Turku Province North (now Satakunta) as a member of the SDP. During her time in Parliament, she sat on the committees on finance, legal affairs, and agriculture and forestry, and frequently worked on economic and tax legislation. From February to May 1970, Eskman was a member of prime minister Mauno Koivisto's cabinet as Minister in the Prime Minister's Office. She was Second Minister of Finance in Rafael Paasio's second cabinet from February to May 1972, and was the first woman to hold that position. As the second minister of finance, Eskman worked on collective bargaining policies and helped implement the separation of taxes for married couples in Finland. She is described in The National Biography of Finland as one of the most important female politicians of the SDP during the 1970s.

She resigned her ministerial position in 1972 to become the director-general of Kela, the Social Insurance Institution of Finland. She was the first female director-general of the institution and remained in the position for four years. She was elected as the vice president of the SDP in 1972, and was the second woman to hold a leadership position in the party, after Tyyne Leivo-Larsson. In 1976, Eskman became the director-general of Finland's National Board of Social Welfare, succeeding Alli Lahtinen; she was the second director-general of the board since its creation in 1968. She retired in 1984 due to health issues.

Death
Eskman died at Satakunta Central Hospital in Pori on 15 September 1990 after a long illness, at the age of 65.

See also
List of Cabinet Ministers from Finland by ministerial portfolio

References

1925 births
1990 deaths
20th-century Finnish women politicians
Government ministers of Finland
Members of the Parliament of Finland (1966–70)
Members of the Parliament of Finland (1972–75)
People from Hattula
Social Democratic Party of Finland politicians
University of Tampere alumni
Women government ministers of Finland
Women members of the Parliament of Finland